The Port of Wuhan is the natural river port of the sub-provincial city of Wuhan, Hubei Province, People's Republic of China. The port lies at the confluence of the Yangtze and Hanjiang rivers. It is able to handle ocean-going ships of 10,000DWT. In 2013, it had a throughput of 42.2 million tons of cargo, and 513,229 TEU of containers.

History

Hankou was one of the Treaty Ports opened by the Treaties of Tientsin in 1858.

Layout
The Port of Wuhan is located on the shores of the Yangtze and Hanjiang rivers. The river channel is 10m deep during the wet season. As of 2012 the WHPG had 51 production berths, 122.45 km2 of port areas, 7,579m of quayside, 43.4 ha of warehouses. Including all other minor operators, the port had 244 berths.

As of 2012, Wuhan Port had 24 port areas, of which 9 were the main Port Areas:
Jinkou Heavy Lift Cargo Port Area (金口重件港区)
Tunkou Vehicles and Oil Port Area (沌口汽车与油品港区)
Hanyang Container and Bulk Cargo Area (汉阳集装箱与散杂货港区)
Hankou Tourist and Passengers Port Area (汉口旅游客运港区)
Qingshan Ore and Steel Port Area (青山矿石与4港)
Zuoling Dangerous Chemicals Port Area (左岭危化品港区)
Yangluo Container Port Area (阳逻集装箱港区) 
Huashan Container Port Area (花山集装箱港区)
Linsifang Coal Port Area (林四房煤炭港区): Under planning

The planned reorganization of the port would create 15 port areas by 2020:

Hannan Port Area (汉南港区)
Dengnan Operations Area Dry bulk cargo, general cargo, Ro-ro vehicles
Shamao Operations Area Ro-ro vehicles, bulk cargo and general cargo.
Junshan Port Area(): Ro-ro vehicles and general cargo.
Tunkou Port Area():Ro-ro vehicles, clean cargo and urban supplies. 
Yangsi Port Area() Tourism and passengers
Wuhu Port Area(): general cargo, oil and liquid chemicals.  
Yangluo Port Area()Core of the port and focus of development. Containers. 
Linsifang Port Area(): Coal transshipment 
Jiangxia Port Area(): Dry bulk and ro-ro vehicles. 
Qingling Port Area(): Clean cargo and urban supplies 
Qingshan Port Area() Retain current functions
Baihushan Port Area (白浒山港区) Containers, oil and liquid chemicals
Qingfeng Port Area()  Serving the Wujiashan Technology Economic Development Area. Hanjiang River 
Duoluokou Port Area(): General cargo and urban supplies. Hanjiang river
Caidian Port Area(): Retain current functions. Hanjiang river. 
Yongantang Port Area(): Preserve current functions. Hanjiang river.

By 2030, the plan is for the port to have 422 production berths and a capacity of 251 million tonnes per annum.

Administration

The Port of Wuhan is mainly operated by the Wuhan Port Group Co., Ltd.

Operations
The Port has 20.9 km of internal railways, and like other ports on the Yangtze, it is trying to increase its intermodal capabilities. 318 units of cargo handling equipment.

Anchorages can hold 700,000 DWT of shipping.

The Port Group has 140 workboats, including tugboats and barges.

References

External links
Port of Wuhan website
Wuhan Container Terminal website
 Wuhan City Port and Navigation Management Office (local MSA office)
 Wuhan Xingang Sanjiang Port Economic Area
 

Buildings and structures in Wuhan
Ports and harbours of China
Transport in Wuhan